Geng Shuang (born April 1973) is a Chinese politician serving as China's Deputy Permanent Representative to the United Nations. He formerly served as the deputy director of the Information Department of the Ministry of Foreign Affairs.

Biography
Geng was born in Beijing in April 1973. He received a Bachelor of Arts in English language from China Foreign Affairs University in 1995 and a Master of Arts in international relations from Tufts University in 2006.

Beginning in 1995, he served in several posts in the Foreign Ministry, including staff member, secretary, counsellor, and division director.

He was counsellor of the Chinese Embassy in the United States from 2011 to 2015.

In 2015, he returned to Beijing and was appointed the counsellor of the Foreign Ministry's International Economic Division.

He was elevated to deputy director of the Foreign Ministry Information Department in 2016. On September 26, 2016, he became a spokesperson for the Ministry of Foreign Affairs of the People's Republic of China.

During a routine press conference on 5 June 2020, Geng Shuang announced that he would no longer be holding the position of spokesperson for China's Foreign Ministry. He was succeeded by Zhao Lijian. On July 7, he presented his credentials to the United Nations Secretariat as China's new Deputy Permanent Representative and Ambassador.

Business

On May 31, 2019, Geng Shuang issued a statement to Canada: "We hope that the Canadian side can have a clear understanding of the consequences of endangering itself for the gains of the U.S. and take immediate actions to correct its mistakes so as to spare itself the suffering from growing damage." The statement was in response to China's detention of Michael Kovrig and Michael Spavor in response to the house arrest of China-based Huawei's Chief Financial Officer, Meng Wanzhou. Meng is free on bail and living in an expensive home in Vancouver, Canada. When publicly asked by the German envoy to the UN security council to release the men being held in prison without trial, Geng expressed his happiness that the envoy was leaving his post.

Personal life
Geng is married and has a daughter.

References

1973 births
Tufts University alumni
Living people
People's Republic of China politicians from Beijing
Chinese Communist Party politicians from Beijing
Spokespersons for the Ministry of Foreign Affairs of the People's Republic of China